Sanxia may refer to:

 Three Gorges, on the Yangtze River in the People's Republic of China
Three Gorges Dam
 Sanxia Prison, in Chongqing, People's Republic of China
 Sanxia District, New Taipei, Republic of China (Taiwan)

See also
Tam Hiệp (disambiguation)